Glomeropitcairnia erectiflora is a plant species in the genus Glomeropitcairnia. This epiphytic tank bromeliad species is native to Venezuela and to the island of Trinidad, occurring in montane and elfin cloud forests. It is used by tree frog Phytotriades auratus as a refuge and nesting site.

References

Tillandsioideae
Flora of Venezuela
Flora of Trinidad and Tobago
Plants described in 1905
Flora without expected TNC conservation status